Raymond James Ratkowski (born November 10, 1939) was a professional American football halfback. He played football at the University of Notre Dame.   He was drafted in the 17th round of the 1961 NFL draft and played for the Boston Patriots of the American Football League during the 1961 AFL season.

Ratkowski later served in the Marine Corps and worked for the FBI.  Upon retirement to Cape Cod he developed an interest in expressionist painting.  He died on April 30, 2012.
Ray was an all-city running back at St. Francis Prep in Brooklyn.

References

Players of American football from New York City
Boston Patriots players
American football halfbacks
Notre Dame Fighting Irish football players
1939 births
Living people
American Football League players